The Original Fleetwood Mac is a compilation album by British blues rock band Fleetwood Mac, first released in May 1971. It consists of various outtakes recorded by the first incarnation of the band in 1967–68. The album was re-released in 2000 with four extra tracks, and re-released in 2004 with seven different extra tracks (and not including the four extra tracks from the 2000 re-release).

Track listing
All songs written by Peter Green, except where noted.
"Drifting"
"Leaving Town Blues"
"Watch Out"
"A Fool No More"
"Mean Old Fireman" (Arthur Crudup)
"Can't Afford to Do It" (Homesick James)
"Fleetwood Mac"
"Worried Dream" (B.B. King)
"Love That Woman" (Lafayette Leake)
"Allow Me One More Show" (Jeremy Spencer)
"First Train Home"
"Rambling Pony #2"

Extra tracks on re-release (2000)
"Mighty Cold" (Doc Pomus, Mort Shuman)
"Jumping at Shadows" [live] (Duster Bennett)
"Somebody's Gonna Get Their Head Kicked In Tonite" (Spencer)
"Man of Action" (Spencer)

Extra tracks on re-release (2004)
Recorded in October 1968 except where noted.
"Watch Out" – [Take 1 incomplete, previously unreleased] (November 1967)
"Something Inside of Me" (Danny Kirwan) – [master version was used on the USA LP English Rose]
"Something Inside of Me" (Kirwan) – [Take 2, previously unreleased]
"Something Inside of Me" (Kirwan) – [Take 3, previously unreleased]
"One Sunny Day" (Kirwan) – [also used on English Rose]
"Without You" (Kirwan) – [also used on English Rose]
"Coming Your Way" (Kirwan) – [Take 6, previously unreleased]

Credits
Peter Green – vocals, guitar, harmonica
Jeremy Spencer – vocals, slide guitar
John McVie – bass guitar
Mick Fleetwood – drums
Danny Kirwan – vocals, guitar on extra 2004 release tracks #2–7
Bob Brunning – bass guitar on track 12

References

Albums produced by Mike Vernon (record producer)
Fleetwood Mac compilation albums
1971 compilation albums
Blue Horizon Records compilation albums
CBS Records compilation albums